Winterhawk is a 1975 American Western film co-written, produced and directed by Charles B. Pierce. Starring Leif Erickson, Woody Strode, Denver Pyle, L.Q. Jones, Michael Dante and Elisha Cook Jr., the story concerns an Indian chief from the Blackfoot tribe who attempts to get help for his tribe who have been infected by smallpox. He is betrayed by the people from whom he seeks help.

About the film
The film is set in the early 19th century. Winterhawk, the chief of a Blackfoot tribe and played by Michael Dante, seeks help for his smallpox infected tribe by attempting to trade furs. In a double cross, the furs are stolen. Following the double cross, which involves the theft of his furs and pelts and the killing of his two companions, he and his braves come back to the town. He takes his revenge by kidnapping a white woman, played by Dawn Wells, and her young brother. He is then pursued by a posse.

Reviews
David W. Reid of The Spokesman Review referred to the film as an honest tale. Reviewer Peter Morris of the Milwaukee Sentinel commented on the high standard of cinematography with the surrounding landscape that made it a nature film as well as a lively adventure. Marshall Fine, staff writer for the Lawrence Journal-World, gave a very negative review of the film, and said it had the most unappealing character actors anyone would hope to assemble.

References

External links
 
 Rogerebert.com - Winterhawk

1975 films
American Western (genre) films
1975 Western (genre) films
1970s English-language films
Films directed by Charles B. Pierce
1970s American films